The American Booksellers Association (ABA) founded The American Booksellers Foundation for Free Expression (ABFFE) in 1990. The ABFFE is a non-profit organization whose mission is to protect and promote free speech in the United States. ABFFE advises individuals who oppose book challenges and bans nationally and in local communities across the country. ABFFE provides resources and education on the importance of free expression to booksellers, politicians, the press, and the public.

Legal work
ABFFE participates in legal cases involving First Amendment rights, including filing an amicus brief in the Supreme Court case US v Stevens. ABFFE also filed a brief in Federal Communications Commission v. Fox Television Stations and celebrated two free speech victories in the courts after filing briefs in the American Academy of Religion, Association of American University Presses, PEN American Center, Ramadan v Chertoff et al. and Trump v O’Brien. ABFFE is active in a five-year campaign to restore reader privacy safeguards affected by the USA PATRIOT Act.

The ABFFE tracks all cases of attempts by law enforcement to seize bookstore records.

Activities
Each year, ABFFE sponsors Banned Books Week, a national celebration of the right to read, in conjunction with the American Booksellers Association, the Association of American Publishers, the American Society of Journalists and Authors, the National Association of College Stores, and the American Library Association.

ABFFE also sponsors the Kids’ Right to Read Project, a collaboration with the National Coalition Against Censorship,  that "offers support, education, and advocacy to people facing book challenges or bans and engages local activists in promoting the freedom to read."

See also
American Booksellers Foundation for Free Expression v. Strickland

References

External links
Official website

Non-profit organizations based in New York City
Bookselling trade associations